The Inglefield Mountains are a mountain range in southeastern Ellesmere Island, Nunavut, Canada. Rocky cliffs border the coastal areas. Like most other mountain ranges in the Canadian Arctic, the Inglefield Mountains are part of the Arctic Cordillera.

There have been very few sightings of wildlife in the Inglefield Mountains because the mountains are north of the Arctic tree line and because of the harsh cold climate. However, the areas nunataks may support one-third of the nationally vulnerable Canadian ivory gull population. During the 1980s, the rock outcrops supported between 730 and 830 adult ivory gulls.

See also
List of mountain ranges

References

Mountain ranges of Qikiqtaaluk Region
Arctic Cordillera